Always is the fifth studio album by English recording artist Gabrielle. It was released by Systemtactic Limited and Go! Beat Records on 1 October 2007 through Universal Music. Her first release in over three years, Gabrielle reteamed with longtime collaborators Julian Gallagher and The Boilerhouse Boys to work on the album. Always received positive reviews from music critics and entered the UK Albums Chart at number 11 and the UK R&B Album Chart at number 4. A supporting tour took place in February 2008.

Track listing

Personnel
Adapted from AllMusic.

Juan Alaya - guitar
Mat Bartram - assistant engineer
Mark Berrow - violin
Rachel Bolt - viola
Tom Brock - composer
Gustav Clarkson - viola
David "Crackers" Cracknell - piano
Caroline Dale - cello
David Daniels - cello
Andy Dean - bass, composer, producer
Liz Edwards	Violin
Gabrielle - composer, primary artist
Dillon Gallagher - engineer
Julian Gallagher - composer, drums, producer
Simon Hale - piano, string arrangements, strings
Ash Howes - mixing
Richard Hynd - composer, keyboards, programming
Garfield Jackson - viola
Anders Kallmark - keyboards, mixing, programming
Patrick Kiernan - violin
Boguslaw Kostecki - violin
Peter Lale - viola
Chris Laurence - double bass
Julian Leaper - violin
William Lockhart - percussion, timpani
Martin Loveday - cello
Rita Manning - violin
Christian Marsac - guitar, saxophone
Perry Mason - leader, violin
David McAlmont - background vocals
Ally McErlaine - guitar
Steve Morris - violin
Everton Nelson - violin
Tom Pigott-Smith - violin
Chris Pitsillides - viola
Chris Potter - engineer, mixing
Steve Price - engineer
Carmen Reece - background vocals
Johnathan Rees - violin
Robert Nelson Relf - composer
Frank Ricotti - percussion
Root - art direction, design
Jackie Shave - violin
Matthew Shave - photography
Emlyn Singleton - violin
Derrick Taylor - bass, violin
Cathy Thompson - violin
Christopher Tombling - violin
Helen Tunstall - harp
Lawrence Watson - photography
Paul Weller - guitar, background vocals
Bruce White - viola
Ben Wiesner - drums
Jonathan Williams - cello
Ben Wolff - composer, drums, producer
David Woodcock - violin
Gavyn Wright - orchestra leader, violin
Warren Zielinski - violin

Charts

References

2007 albums
Gabrielle (singer) albums